Arun Bamal (born 2 June 1997) is an Indian cricketer. He made his first-class debut for Services in the 2017–18 Ranji Trophy on 6 October 2017. He made his Twenty20 debut for Services in the 2017–18 Zonal T20 League on 8 January 2018. He made his List A debut for Services in the 2017–18 Vijay Hazare Trophy on 6 February 2018.

References

External links
 

1997 births
Living people
Indian cricketers
Place of birth missing (living people)
Services cricketers